First Presbyterian Church is an historic church at 2100 4th Avenue, North in Birmingham, Alabama.  It was built in 1888 and added to the National Register of Historic Places in 1982.
It is a member of the Presbytery of Sheppards & Lapsley.

References

Presbyterian churches in Alabama
Churches on the National Register of Historic Places in Alabama
National Register of Historic Places in Birmingham, Alabama
Gothic Revival church buildings in Alabama
Churches completed in 1888
Churches in Birmingham, Alabama